TNL, formerly registered as The New Liberals, is an Australian political party formed in 2019. Victor Kline, a barrister from Sydney, was the founder and party leader. , the party president is Katharine Kline and the party leader is Bess Brennan.

The party believes in Modern Monetary Theory, ⁣ and publishes declarations of political donations they receive.

Foundation and registration
Victor Kline and three friends founded TNL in response to what they saw as “a government that had apparently mastered the art of bare-faced corruption and an opposition that seemed incapable of calling them out”. Initially, the party was named “The New Liberals”. Kline claimed that the word “liberal” has twisted into a misnomer by the Liberal Party of Australia, and that many moderate disaffected Liberal and ex-Liberal voters are attracted to TNL.

The party's registration was approved by the Australian Electoral Commission on 3 June 2021. The Liberal Party of Australia objected the registration, due to the similarity in party names and the potential to cause confusion among electors. Due to changes to the Commonwealth Electoral Act 1918 regarding party names, this decision overturned by the Australian Electoral Commission and the party's registration was revoked on 7 December 2021. The party was re-registered again as TNL on 17 March 2022.

Policies
Some of the party's key policies include:

 A federal anti corruption commission. The proposed Independent Commission Against Corruption (ICAC) would have the power to investigate and prosecute politicians, judges, and bureaucrats who found to be corrupt or who act in dereliction of their duty. The ICAC would be run by a board of commissioners who are respected and prominent citizens. None of these citizens would be from any of the three branches of Australian government. A special court would be set up to hear ICAC trials. The trials would be by jury, as opposed to being judged by a judge alone. Penalties for anyone convicted would include imprisonment and/or fines.
A climate policy with the goal of achieving net-zero carbon emissions by 2030. According to TNL, the world must reach net-zero emissions by 2030 to delay any further risk of harm to the planet. The policy based on the strategies and modelling undertaken by ClimateWorks Australia in their publication 'Decarbonisation Futures: Solutions, actions and benchmarks for a net-zero emissions Australia'. The policy sets out in detail how to decarbonise and incorporate zero-emission technologies into key sectors including: electricity generation, commercial and residential buildings, transport, industry, agriculture, and land. Under the proposed policy, TCL claims that the outcomes would be compatible with a global temperature rise of 1.5 degrees Celsius and reach a net-zero emission position for Australia by 2030.
 A full employment and job guarantee scheme (JGS). The policy aims 'to provide decent jobs at decent pay on demand to all individuals of legal working age who want to work.' Jobs would be created in proximity to where the unemployed live and would be suitable to people of varied education and skill levels. The JGS would offer a wage set at 60% of the median Australian wage. The program is completely voluntary but will offer permanent full-time employment. Those who choose not to be employed by the JGS will still be able to access unemployment benefits. Australian citizens are currently able to register for the JGS via TNL website. Those who register will be ensured of early placement in the Scheme.

Leadership
Victor Kline (July 2019 – present)
Katharine Kline – president (2022–present)
Bess Brennan – party leader (2022–present)

Electoral history
In the 2020 Eden-Monaro by-election, Karen Porter ran as an Independent under the party banner. Porter received 1.28% of votes, placing 7th out of 14 candidates

In the 2022 Federal Election, the party endorsed eight candidates for the House of Representatives, in four states. None were successful. The party also endorsed a total of eight candidates for the Senate, two in New South Wales and six in Queensland.

Christian Porter case
In June 2021, Kline announced that he, along with party candidate and former prosecutor Vania Holt, would be pursuing a private criminal case against Christian Porter over historical rape allegations he is facing.

References

External links
Official website

2019 establishments in Australia
Political parties established in 2019
TNL